Ryan Scott Prince (born May 16, 1977) is a former American football tight end who played for the Jacksonville Jaguars of the National Football League (NFL). He played college football at Weber State University.

References 

1977 births
Living people
People from Farmington, Utah
Players of American football from Utah
American football tight ends
Weber State Wildcats football players
Jacksonville Jaguars players